may refer to:
Yoshida Station (吉田駅 (新潟県), on the JR East Echigo and Yahiko Lines in Tsubame, Niigata Prefecture, Japan
Hamayoshida Station (浜吉田駅), formerly Yoshida Station, on the JR East Jōban Line in Watari, Miyagi Prefecture, Japan

See also
Iyo-Yoshida Station (伊予吉田駅), on the Shikoku Railway Yosan Line in Yoshida-chō, Uwajima, Ehime Prefecture, Japan
Kira Yoshida Station (吉良吉田駅), on the Nagoya Railroad Gamogōri and Nishio Lines in Kira, Aichi Prefecture, Japan
Shinano-Yoshida Station (信濃吉田駅), on the Nagano Electric Railway Nagano Line in Nagano, Nagano Prefecture, Japan
Yoshidaguchi Station (吉田口駅), on the JR West Geibi Line in Akitakata, Hiroshima Prefecture, Japan
Yoshita Station (吉田駅 (大阪府)), on the Kintetsu Keihanna Line in Higashiosaka, Osaka Prefecture, Japan